Sir Frank Kenyon Roberts  (27 October 1907 – 7 January 1998) was a British diplomat. He played a key role in British diplomacy in the early years of the Cold War, and in developing Anglo-German relations in the 1960s.

Born in Buenos Aires, Argentina, he was educated at Bedales School, Rugby School and Trinity College, Cambridge, where he graduated in 1930 with first-class honours in history. He entered the Foreign Office in 1930, having been first-placed in the entrance examination.

His first overseas posting was to Paris, followed by Cairo where he married Celeste Leila Beatrix "Cella" Shoucair (died 1990). Roberts returned to London in 1937 to work in the central department of the Foreign Office, where, as a still relatively junior official, he was involved in much of the diplomacy with Nazi Germany in the lead-up to World War II. When war broke out, he was British joint secretary of the Anglo French Supreme War Council (SWC) from 1939 to 1940, and acted as interpreter during the third meeting of the SWC which took place at 10 Downing Street on 17 November 1939.

He was based in London until January 1945, when he was posted to Moscow, serving as an advisor to Winston Churchill at the Yalta conference and as British minister to the Soviet Union until 1947. With the United States Deputy Chief of Mission, George Kennan, he developed the analysis of Soviet foreign policy which formed the basis of the British and American policy of containment. He returned to London in 1947 as private secretary to Foreign Secretary Ernest Bevin, where he was involved in the negotiations with the Russians and the Americans over the Berlin airlift in 1947 and 1948. He was then Deputy High Commissioner to India from 1949 to 1951 and Deputy-Under Secretary of State at the Foreign Office from 1951 to 1954. In the latter year, he was appointed Ambassador Extraordinary and Plenipotentiary to Yugoslavia, a post he held until 1957, when he became British Permanent Representative on the North Atlantic Council to 1960.

He was Ambassador to the USSR from 1960 to 1962, and Ambassador to the Federal Republic of Germany (West Germany) from 1963 to 1968. He was awarded a CMG in 1946, knighted  in 1956, advanced to GCMG in 1963, and made GCVO in 1965.

Roberts was a hard-working and skilful negotiator, well-informed, and skilled in finding a way through difficulties. He won the confidence of the many ministers he served, including Churchill, Ernest Bevin, Anthony Eden, Harold Macmillan, Rab Butler, Edward Heath, Harold Wilson, Michael Stewart, and George Brown. He also developed a good relationship with the foreign leaders he dealt with, including Joseph Stalin, Josip Broz Tito, Konrad Adenauer, Willy Brandt, and Helmut Schmidt. However, his role in the development of a close relationship between Britain and Germany did not lead to stronger German support for British membership of the European Economic Community.

He and his wife had no children. He maintained good health in his lengthy retirement, serving as a member of the Duncan committee on overseas representation in 1969, president of the British Atlantic Committee and of the European Atlantic Group, on the council of Chatham House. His main interest remained with Germany: he was president of the German chamber of commerce and industry in the UK, chairman of the steering committee of the Königswinter conference, Member of the Board of Governors of the European Institute for the Media and a founder member of the young Königswinter conference. He also accepted non-executive directorships of German and British companies, including Mercedes Benz and Unilever (for which his father had worked in Buenos Aires).

After his wife's death in 1990, he published in 1991 his memoirs, Dealing with Dictators, which she had helped him to write. In the 1990s, he became known as television commentator on the history of the 1940s and 1950s. He died in Kensington, London on 7 January 1998.

Publications

References 

Sir Frank Kenyon Roberts in the Dictionary of National Biography
1995 CNN interview

External links 
The Papers of Sir Frank Roberts at the Churchill Archives Centre, Cambridge

Interview with Sir Frank Kenyon Roberts & transcript, British Diplomatic Oral History Programme, Churchill College, Cambridge, 1996

1907 births
1998 deaths
Ambassadors of the United Kingdom to Yugoslavia
Knights Grand Cross of the Order of St Michael and St George
Knights Grand Cross of the Royal Victorian Order
People educated at Rugby School
People educated at Bedales School
Alumni of Trinity College, Cambridge
Ambassadors of the United Kingdom to the Soviet Union
Ambassadors of the United Kingdom to West Germany
Principal Private Secretaries to the Secretary of State for Foreign and Commonwealth Affairs
Members of HM Diplomatic Service
Council and directors of Chatham House
20th-century British diplomats
Permanent Representatives of the United Kingdom to NATO